Frost is a lunar impact crater that is attached to the southern rim of the walled plain Landau, and lies on the far side of the Moon. Just to the east is Petropavlovskiy, and to the northeast along the edge of Landau is Razumov. The crater Douglass is located less than a crater diameter to the west-southwest.

The outer rim of Frost is eroded, but is overlaid by only one small craterlet along the northeast side. The inner wall is wider and heavier along the northern side where it has been reinforced by the former rim of Landau. The northern part of the interior floor is occupied by two smaller craters, with the larger of the two along the northwest inner wall. The southern part of the floor is relatively level and featureless.

Human activity
Frost was originally selected as the site of Station 5 for the Apollo 15 lunar surface operations, however astronaut David Scott elected to alter the mission plans and skip over the crater, believing that it was unlikely to be geologically distinct from the areas the Apollo 15 astronauts had already visited.

Satellite craters
By convention these features are identified on lunar maps by placing the letter on the side of the crater midpoint that is closest to Frost.

References

Further reading

 
 
 
 
 
 
 
 
 
 
 
 

Impact craters on the Moon